Ružić is a village and a municipality in Šibenik-Knin County, Croatia. In the 2011 census, it had a total of 1,591 inhabitants. In the 2011 census, 98.99% of the population were Croats.

The settlements in the municipality are:
 Baljci (population 3)
 Čavoglave (population 168)
 Gradac (population 317)
 Kljake (population 261)
 Mirlović Polje (population 170)
 Moseć (population 75)
 Otavice (population 183)
 Ružić (population 266)
 Umljanović (population 148)

References

Municipalities of Croatia
Populated places in Šibenik-Knin County